These are the official results of the Men's shot put event at the 1994 European Championships in Helsinki, Finland, held at Helsinki Olympic Stadium on 12 and 13 August 1994. There were a total number of 25 participating athletes, with two qualifying groups .

Medalists

Final

Qualifying round
Held on 12 August 1994

Participation
According to an unofficial count, 25 athletes from 15 countries participated in the event.

 (1)
 (1)
 (3)
 (3)
 (1)
 (1)
 (2)
 (1)
 (2)
 (1)
 (1)
 (3)
 (3)
 (1)
 (1)

See also
 1991 Men's World Championships Shot Put (Tokyo)
 1992 Men's Olympic Shot Put (Barcelona)
 1993 Men's World Championships Shot Put (Stuttgart)
 1994 Shot Put Year Ranking
 1995 Men's World Championships Shot Put (Gothenburg)
 1996 Men's Olympic Shot Put (Atlanta)
 1997 Men's World Championships Shot Put (Athens)

References

 Results

Shot put
Shot put at the European Athletics Championships